Comrade Dhanwantri (7 March 1902 – 13 July 1953) was a freedom fighter and one of the founder of Communist Party of India in Jammu and Kashmir. During the British Raj, he was arrested by the British authorities and jailed for an overall period of 17 years out of his total adult life of 34 years.

The Communist Party of India Jammu and Kashmir State headquarters, Dhanwantri Bhavan, is named in his honor.

References

1902 births
1953 deaths
Indian independence activists
Indian independence activists from Jammu and Kashmir
Communist Party of India politicians from Jammu and Kashmir